Farmida Bi  is a British corporate solicitor and the EMEA Chair of Norton Rose Fulbright, having also served as Global Chair in 2022. She is the United Kingdom's first female chair of a major law firm, and has been named one of Britain's top five most powerful Muslim women. She stood as a Labour Party candidate in two elections, and founded Progressive British Muslims three days after the 7/7 London bombings. She was appointed a CBE in the 2020 Birthday Honours for services to Law and charity.

Early life and education 
Bi was born in Pakistan, and moved to the United Kingdom at the age of six. She came from a traditional, working-class, British Muslim background, where her mother expected her to marry a first cousin and devote the rest of her life to her husband and family. At the age of 14, this inspired her interest in rights and fairness, and a desire to become a lawyer. She left home to read law at the University of Cambridge, causing a rift between her and her mother and aunt that never fully healed. Although her mother had difficulty understanding Bi's life, she eventually came to terms with it. At Cambridge, she studied at Downing College, graduating in 1989 with a Master of Laws.

Career 
Bi trained as a solicitor at Clifford Chance, qualifying in 1992, before working as an associate at JPMorgan and Cleary Gottlieb Steen & Hamilton. She qualified as a New York attorney in 1999, and was partner at Denton Wilde Sapte from 2002 to 2008, following which she joined Norton Rose Fulbright.

In the 2005 United Kingdom general election, she stood as a Labour Party candidate in Mole Valley, Surrey, winning 10.7% of the vote. Bi also ran as the Labour candidate for the Hillside ward in the 2006 Merton London Borough Council election, winning 13.2% of the vote.

She was appointed Chair of EMEA at Norton Rose Fulbright in 2018, making her the first female chair of a major law firm in the United Kingdom, and she continues in that role. She also served as the firm's Global Chair in 2022.

In 2021, she became Chair of the Barbican Centre Trust (the registered charity supporting the Barbican Centre), and she has been Chair of the Patchwork Foundation (a charity promoting the integration of disadvantaged and minority communities into public life) since 2018.

Awards and honours 
In 2009, Bi was named one of the United Kingdom's five most powerful Muslim women. She was a nominated for the British Muslim Awards in 2013, 2014 and 2015 for services to finance and accounts, and services to law. In 2018, she was named one of the Financial Times' Top 10 most innovative lawyers and listed in Cranfield University's 2019 Women to Watch supplement. She was included in the Women Role Model list in 2019. She was appointed a CBE in the 2020 Birthday Honours for services to Law and charity. Bi has been recognised for her commitment to action towards diversity and inclusion in the workplace. She is Chair of the Patchwork Foundation and Barbican Centre Trust, and has been trustee of the Muslim Youth Helpline. She was appointed an Honorary Fellow of Downing College, Cambridge in June 2022.

References 

1967 births
Living people
Lawyers from London
British lawyers of Pakistani descent
English women lawyers
21st-century British lawyers
Alumni of Downing College, Cambridge
Pakistani emigrants to England
21st-century English women politicians
21st-century English politicians
British Muslims
Labour Party (UK) parliamentary candidates
Commanders of the Order of the British Empire
Corporate lawyers